The Slender Nudes is the first studio album by South African recording artist Ashton Nyte, frontman for the gothic rock band The Awakening.  The style is described as "Ziggy era Glam Rock with 80's-induced synthpop" and the album ranked 14th on the Top 30 Albums for 2000 in South Africa.

The album featured the artist's experimentation with alter-egos such as the "Electric Man" and "Glam Vamp."  Two videos were produced for the album, "Glam Vamp Baby" (included on the album) and Need for Air both of which were aired throughout South African television.

Album Covers
The South African version of The Slender Nudes featured Nyte kneeling next to a pale nude woman.  When the album was released in the US, distributors feared that the artwork would prove objectionable to the American market and proposed an alternative cover.  Copies sold in the US feature an image of Nyte as the Glam Vamp, the alter-ego portrayed in the same titled video.

Track listing

 Glam Vamp Baby
 Selling Skin
 Obscene
 Need For Air
 Too Young
 Hunting
 Fashion Forgot
 Noisecolour 
 Electric Man
 Lilly’s World 
 Girlie

Video: Glam Vamp Baby

References

2000 debut albums